The Pala Casino 400 is a 400-mile (643.737 km) NASCAR Cup Series stock car race held at the Auto Club Speedway in Fontana, California. It is the second race of the Cup Series season (after the Daytona 500) and has been since 2022 as well as from 2005 to 2010.

History

Prior to 2005, the race was held in late April or early May, and until 2010, the race was run at a length of 500 miles. When the NASCAR Realignment of 2005 was made, the race was moved to February and the week following the Daytona 500. The race was moved from February to March in 2011. After being pleased with the results of the shortening of the track's former fall race date, the Pepsi Max 400, from 500 to 400 miles, this race was also shortened to 400 miles in 2011.

The Automobile Club of Southern California, the title sponsor of the track, was the title sponsor of the race from 2003 to 2020. WillCo Intelligent Stored Energy (WISE) Power became the title sponsor of the race in 2022. The Pala Casino Resort and Spa became the title sponsor of the race in 2023.

Past winners

Notes
2006, and 2014–2017: Race extended due to a NASCAR Overtime finish. The 2015 race took two attempts.
2008: The race started on Sunday but was finished on Monday due to rain.
2011: Race distance changed from 500 miles to 400. Kevin Harvick passed Jimmie Johnson on the last lap to win, the first final-lap pass in ACS history.
2012: Race shortened due to rain.
2019: Kyle Busch's 200th-career NASCAR win across all top three divisions.
2021: Race canceled and moved to the Daytona road course (O'Reilly Auto Parts 253) due to the COVID-19 pandemic.

Multiple winners (drivers)

Multiple winners (teams)

Manufacturer wins

History
1997: After nearly a decade, NASCAR came back to Southern California on June 22 with the inaugural California 500. The race featured 21 lead changes among a dozen different drivers. Jeff Gordon passed Mark Martin with 11 laps remaining and sped to victory. Terry Labonte took second, giving Hendrick Motorsports another 1–2 finish.
2000: Jeremy Mayfield scores a win for Penske Racing South, his second of his career. During the post-race celebration, Mayfield jumped on the roof of the car and dented it, leaving the car to be too short and penalizing Mayfield championship points. For a while following the incident, NASCAR prevented drivers from being on the roof of the car in the Victory Lane, although drivers were later allowed to jump on the roof during victory celebrations.
2001: On what would have been Dale Earnhardt's 50th birthday, the race was running with Rusty Wallace holding off Jeff Gordon at the end. During the celebration, Rusty had a 3 flag to fly around the track in the reverse direction. In 1993, Earnhardt and Wallace ran in reverse to hold Alan Kulwicki and Davey Allison flags at the last race in Atlanta that year. After Dale's death, Rusty was the last driver of that group of four drivers to race.  
2002: There were ten drivers who failed to finish the race; with five of the drivers forcing to leave the race due to terminal crashes while five other drivers had engine issues. Nearly 10% of the 199-minute race was held under a caution flag and the average green flag run was approximately 38 laps. Dale Earnhardt Jr.'s unfortunate accident forced NASCAR to pass a regulation forcing drivers to take the ambulance ride to the infield care center every time they crashed; he did not admit to having this injury until mid-September, resulting in changes to NASCAR's concussion policy. In the end, Jimmie Johnson holds off Kurt Busch to score his first career win.
2008: The race started on Sunday, completing only 87 laps with 7 yellow flags and 2 red flags. One red flag was caused on lap 21 during the first day when Casey Mears spun upon hitting the water that had seeps up through cracks in the track, collided with Dale Earnhardt Jr., then got turned over on his roof by Sam Hornish Jr. NASCAR postponed the remainder of the event to Monday due to a lengthy red flag for rain. The rain delay on Sunday also delayed the Stater Brothers 300 to Monday. Carl Edwards would go on to win the event, while he finished 5th in the Nationwide Series race. The Cup Race was postponed at 2 AM ET on Monday and resumed at 1 PM ET the same day. The Nationwide Series Race was held shortly after 5 PM ET on Monday.
2013: Kyle Busch won after Joey Logano and Denny Hamlin crashed fighting hard for the lead on the last lap. Busch also took the weekend sweep by winning the Nationwide race the day before. It is the first Fontana victory in the NASCAR Cup Series both for Joe Gibbs Racing and Toyota. From 2011 to 2013, Busch finished a reverse order: 3rd (2011), 2nd (2012), and 1st (2013). The last lap crash between Logano and Hamlin sent Hamlin into the inside wall (without a SAFER Barrier) head-on. As a result, he suffered a compression fracture of his L1 vertebra in his back, which forced him to miss four races.
2014: Denny Hamlin missed the race when he came down with a sinus infection that impacted his vision about an hour before the race, necessitating Joe Gibbs Racing to hire Sam Hornish Jr. to drive the car. The race was marred by a massive rash of tire failures, with over 20 tire failures happening in the race itself. Multiple drivers, like Dale Earnhardt Jr., Kevin Harvick, Jimmie Johnson, Brad Keselowski, Marcos Ambrose, and more, fell victim to tire failures and had to work their way back through the field to salvage a lead lap finish. A spin by Clint Bowyer with two laps to go set up a dramatic green-white-checkered finish. Over the second-to-last lap, the field went five wide, with Kurt Busch leading. Over the last lap, Kyle Busch and Nationwide race winner Kyle Larson overtook Kurt for the lead. A side-by-side battle for the lead between Busch and Larson nicknamed the "Kyle and Kyle Show" unfolded. Larson looked like he was going to win his first Cup race, but Busch cleared and moved in front of Larson out of turn 4 and took his second straight win at Auto Club. There were a race-high 35 lead changes among 15 leaders.
2016: After a late-race caution, Jimmie Johnson pulls out of the crowd to hold of leaders Kevin Harvick, and Denny Hamlin to claim his 77th career win in the Superman car, passing Dale Earnhardt in career wins. Johnson would later win his 7th Championship, tying Earnhardt and Richard Petty in most career championships.
2019: Kyle Busch earns his 200th win after sweeping all 3 stages and coming back from a penalty on pit road, tying Richard Petty for the most NASCAR National Series wins.
2020: Following a pre-race tribute to Jimmie Johnson in his final race at Fontana, his Hendrick Motorsports teammate Alex Bowman leads a race-high 110 laps to earn his second career victory.
2022: The Cup Series returned to Fontana after a two-year absence. The race featured 12 cautions (a new track record) and 32 lead changes, the last being defending series champion Kyle Larson's pass of Daniel Suarez with three laps to go.

References

External links
 

1997 establishments in California
 
NASCAR Cup Series races
Recurring sporting events established in 1997
Annual sporting events in the United States